Wasit was a medieval city in Iraq, after which the Wasit Governorate is named. It may also refer to other places in the Middle East:
Wasit, Fujairah, United Arab Emirates
Wasit, San‘a’, Yemen
Wasi, Hadhramaut, Yemen

See also
Wasti